The 2022–23 Philadelphia Flyers season is the 56th season for the National Hockey League franchise that was established on June 5, 1967.

Standings

Divisional standings

Conference standings

Schedule and results

Pre-season
The pre-season schedule was published on June 27, 2022.

|- style="background:#cfc;"
| 1 || September 24 || Boston || 2–1 ||  || Grosenick || Wells Fargo Center || 17,575 || 1–0–0 || 
|- style="background:#fcc;"
| 2 || September 27 || @ Buffalo || 1–2 ||  || Grosenick || KeyBank Center || 9,125 || 1–1–0 || 
|- style="background:#fcc;"
| 3 || September 28 || Washington || 1–3 ||  || Sandstrom || Wells Fargo Center || 16,114 || 1–2–0 || 
|- style="background:#fcc;"
| 4 || October 1 || @ Boston || 0–4 ||  || Grosenick || TD Garden || 17,850 || 1–3–0 || 
|- style="background:#fcc;"
| 5 || October 2 || @ NY Islanders || 1–2 ||  || Ersson || UBS Arena || 8,000 || 1–4–0 || 
|- style="background:#fff;"
| 6 || October 4 || NY Islanders || 3–4 || OT || Grosenick || Wells Fargo Center || 16,903 || 1–4–1 || 
|-

Regular season
The regular season schedule was published on July 6, 2022.

|- style="background:#cfc;"
| 1 || October 13 || New Jersey || 5–2 ||  || Hart || Wells Fargo Center || 19,107 || 1–0–0 || 2 || 
|- style="background:#cfc;"
| 2 || October 15 || Vancouver || 3–2 ||  || Hart || Wells Fargo Center || 14,837 || 2–0–0 || 4 || 
|- style="background:#cfc;"
| 3 || October 18 || @ Tampa Bay || 3–2 ||  || Hart || Amalie Arena || 19,092 || 3–0–0 || 6 || 
|- style="background:#fcc;"
| 4 || October 19 || @ Florida || 3–4 ||  || Sandstrom || FLA Live Arena || 17,421 || 3–1–0 || 6 || 
|- style="background:#cfc;"
| 5 || October 22 || @ Nashville || 3–1 ||  || Hart || Bridgestone Arena || 17,470 || 4–1–0 || 8 || 
|- style="background:#fcc;"
| 6 || October 23 || San Jose || 0–3 ||  || Sandstrom || Wells Fargo Center || 14,512 || 4–2–0 || 8 || 
|- style="background:#cfc;"
| 7 || October 27 || Florida || 4–3 ||  || Hart || Wells Fargo Center || 14,871 || 5–2–0 || 10 || 
|- style="background:#ffc;"
| 8 || October 29 || Carolina || 3–4 || OT || Hart || Wells Fargo Center || 13,335 || 5–2–1 || 11 || 
|-

|- style="background:#ffc;"
| 9 || November 1 || @ NY Rangers || 0–1 || OT || Hart || Madison Square Garden || 17,206 || 5–2–2 || 12 || 
|- style="background:#fcc;"
| 10 || November 2 || @ Toronto || 2–5 ||  || Sandstrom || Scotiabank Arena || 18,437 || 5–3–2 || 12 || 
|- style="background:#cfc;"
| 11 || November 5 || @ Ottawa || 2–1 ||  || Hart || Canadian Tire Centre || 16,722 || 6–3–2 || 14 || 
|- style="background:#cfc;"
| 12 || November 8 || St. Louis || 5–1 ||  || Sandstrom || Wells Fargo Center || 15,228 || 7–3–2 || 16 || 
|- style="background:#fcc;"
| 13 || November 10 || @ Columbus || 2–5 ||  || Hart || Nationwide Arena || 15,490 || 7–4–2 || 16 || 
|- style="background:#fcc;"
| 14 || November 12 || Ottawa || 1–4 ||  || Hart || Wells Fargo Center || 16,912 || 7–5–2 || 16 || 
|- style="background:#fcc;"
| 15 || November 13 || Dallas || 1–5 ||  || Sandstrom || Wells Fargo Center || 16,898 || 7–6–2 || 16 || 
|- style="background:#ffc;"
| 16 || November 15 || @ Columbus || 4–5 || OT || Hart || Nationwide Arena || 15,713 || 7–6–3 || 17 || 
|- style="background:#fcc;"
| 17 || November 17 || @ Boston || 1–4 ||  || Hart || TD Garden || 17,850 || 7–7–3 || 17 || 
|- style="background:#ffc;"
| 18 || November 19 || @ Montreal || 4–5 || SO || Hart || Bell Centre || 21,105 || 7–7–4 || 18 || 
|- style="background:#fcc;"
| 19 || November 21 || Calgary || 2–5 ||  || Hart || Wells Fargo Center || 17,896 || 7–8–4 || 18 || 
|- style="background:#ffc;"
| 20 || November 23 || @ Washington || 2–3 || OT || Sandstrom || Capital One Arena || 18,573 || 7–8–5 || 19 || 
|- style="background:#fcc;"
| 21 || November 25 || Pittsburgh || 1–4 ||  || Hart || Wells Fargo Center || 19,309 || 7–9–5 || 19 || 
|- style="background:#fcc;"
| 22 || November 26 || @ NY Islanders || 2–5 ||  || Sandstrom || UBS Arena || 17,255 || 7–10–5 || 19 || 
|- style="background:#cfc;"
| 23 || November 29 || NY Islanders || 3–1 ||  || Hart || Wells Fargo Center || 18,143 || 8–10–5 || 21 || 
|-

|- style="background:#fcc;"
| 24 || December 1 || Tampa Bay || 1–4 ||  || Hart || Wells Fargo Center || 17,867 || 8–11–5 || 21 || 
|- style="background:#fcc;"
| 25 || December 3 || New Jersey || 2–3 ||  || Hart || Wells Fargo Center || 18,427 || 8–12–5 || 21 || 
|- style="background:#cfc;"
| 26 || December 5 || Colorado || 5–3 ||  || Hart || Wells Fargo Center || 18,361 || 9–12–5 || 23 || 
|- style="background:#fcc;"
| 27 || December 7 || Washington || 1–4 ||  || Hart || Wells Fargo Center || 16,826 || 9–13–5 || 23 || 
|- style="background:#ffc;"
| 28 || December 9 || @ Vegas || 1–2 || OT || Hart || T-Mobile Arena || 17,767 || 9–13–6 || 24 || 
|- style="background:#ffc;"
| 29 || December 11 || @ Arizona || 4–5 || OT || Hart || Mullett Arena || 4,600 || 9–13–7 || 25 || 
|- style="background:#fcc;"
| 30 || December 13 || @ Colorado || 2–3 ||  || Sandstrom || Ball Arena || 18,082 || 9–14–7 || 25 || 
|- style="background:#cfc;"
| 31 || December 15 || @ New Jersey || 2–1 ||  || Hart || Prudential Center || 14,137 || 10–14–7 || 27 || 
|- style="background:#fcc;"
| 32 || December 17 || NY Rangers || 3–6 ||  || Hart || Wells Fargo Center || 18,340 || 10–15–7 || 27 || 
|- style="background:#cfc;"
| 33 || December 20 || Columbus || 5–3 ||  || Hart || Wells Fargo Center || 19,432 || 11–15–7 || 29 || 
|- style="background:#fcc;"
| 34 || December 22 || @ Toronto || 3–4 ||  || Hart || Scotiabank Arena || 18,908 || 11–16–7 || 29 || 
|- style="background:#fcc;"
| 35 || December 23 || @ Carolina || 5–6 ||  || Hart || PNC Arena || 18,680 || 11–17–7 || 29 || 
|- style="background:#cfc;"
| 36 || December 29 || @ San Jose || 4–3 || OT || Ersson || SAP Center || 17,562 || 12–17–7 || 31 ||  
|- style="background:#cfc;"
| 37 || December 31 || @ Los Angeles || 4–2 ||  || Ersson || Crypto.com Arena || 18,230 || 13–17–7 || 33 || 
|-

|- style="background:#cfc;"
| 38 || January 2 || @ Anaheim || 4–1 ||  || Ersson || Honda Center || 13,600 || 14–17–7 || 35 || 
|- style="background:#cfc;"
| 39 || January 5 || Arizona || 6–2 ||  || Hart || Wells Fargo Center || 17,572 || 15–17–7 || 37 || 
|- style="background:#fcc;"
| 40 || January 8 || Toronto || 2–6 ||  || Hart || Wells Fargo Center || 17,862 || 15–18–7 || 37 || 
|- style="background:#cfc;"
| 41 || January 9 || @ Buffalo || 4–0 ||  || Ersson || KeyBank Center || 11,271 || 16–18–7 || 39 || 
|- style="background:#cfc;"
| 42 || January 11 || Washington || 5–3 ||  || Hart || Wells Fargo Center || 17,352 || 17–18–7 || 41 || 
|- style="background:#cfc;"
| 43 || January 14 || @ Washington || 3–1 ||  || Hart || Capital One Arena || 18,573 || 18–18–7 || 43 || 
|- style="background:#fcc;"
| 44 || January 16 || @ Boston || 0–6 ||  || Hart || TD Garden || 17,850 || 18–19–7 || 43 || 
|- style="background:#cfc;"
| 45 || January 17 || Anaheim || 5–2 ||  || Ersson || Wells Fargo Center || 16,312 || 19–19–7 || 45 || 
|- style="background:#fcc;"
| 46 || January 19 || Chicago || 1–4 ||  || Hart || Wells Fargo Center || 16,460 || 19–20–7 || 45 || 
|- style="background:#cfc;"
| 47 || January 21 || @ Detroit || 2–1 ||  || Hart || Little Caesars Arena || 19,515 || 20–20–7 || 47 || 
|- style="background:#fcc;"
| 48 || January 22 || Winnipeg || 3–5 ||  || Sandstrom || Wells Fargo Center || 15,441 || 20–21–7 || 47 || 
|- style="background:#ffc;"
| 49 || January 24 || Los Angeles || 3–4 || OT || Hart || Wells Fargo Center || 15,602 || 20–21–8 || 48 || 
|- style="background:#ffc;"
| 50 || January 26 || @ Minnesota || 2–3 || OT || Hart || Xcel Energy Center || 19,177 || 20–21–9 || 49 || 
|- style="background:#cfc;"
| 51 || January 28 || @ Winnipeg || 4–0 ||  || Hart || Canada Life Centre || 14,476 || 21–21–9 || 51 || 
|-

|- style="background:#fcc;"
| 52 || February 6 || NY Islanders || 1–2 ||  || Hart || Wells Fargo Center || 18,695 || 21–22–9 || 51 || 
|- style="background:#cfc;"
| 53 || February 9 || Edmonton || 2–1 || SO || Hart || Wells Fargo Center || 18,851 || 22–22–9 || 53 || 
|- style="background:#ffc;"
| 54 || February 11 || Nashville || 1–2 || OT || Hart || Wells Fargo Center || 19,412 || 22–22–10 || 54 || 
|- style="background:#fcc;"
| 55 || February 12 || Seattle || 3–4 ||  || Sandstrom || Wells Fargo Center || 18,129 || 22–23–10 || 54 || 
|- style="background:#fcc;"
| 56 || February 16 || @ Seattle || 2–6 ||  || Hart || Climate Pledge Arena || 17,151 || 22–24–10 || 54 || 
|- style="background:#fcc;"
| 57 || February 18 || @ Vancouver || 2–6 ||  || Hart || Rogers Arena || 18,799 || 22–25–10 || 54 || 
|- style="background:#cfc;"
| 58 || February 20 || @ Calgary || 4–3 ||  || Ersson || Scotiabank Saddledome || 19,036 || 23–25–10 || 56 || 
|- style="background:#fcc;"
| 59 || February 21 || @ Edmonton || 2–4 ||  || Hart || Rogers Place || 18,347 || 23–26–10 || 56 || 
|- style="background:#fcc;"
| 60 || February 24 || Montreal || 2–5 ||  || Hart || Wells Fargo Center || 19,661 || 23–27–10 || 56 || 
|- style="background:#fcc;"
| 61 || February 25 || @ New Jersey || 0–7 ||  || Ersson || Prudential Center || 16,514 || 23–28–10 || 56 || 
|-

|- style="background:#ffc;"
| 62 || March 1 || NY Rangers || 2–3 || OT || Hart || Wells Fargo Center || 19,534 || 23–28–11 ||  57 || 
|- style="background:#cfc;"
| 63 || March 5 || Detroit || 3–1 ||  || Hart || Wells Fargo Center || 17,630 || 24–28–11 || 59 || 
|- style="background:#fcc;"
| 64 || March 7 || @ Tampa Bay || 2–5 ||  || Hart || Amalie Arena || 19,092 || 24–29–11 || 59 || 
|- style="background:#fcc;"
| 65 || March 9 || @ Carolina || 0–1 ||  || Sandstrom || PNC Arena || 18,680 || 24–30–11 || 59 || 
|- style="background:#fcc;"
| 66 || March 11 || @ Pittsburgh || 1–5 ||  || Hart || PPG Paints Arena || 18,254 || 24–31–11 || 59 || 
|- style="background:#fcc;"
| 67 || March 14 || Vegas || 3–5 ||  || Sandstrom || Wells Fargo Center || 17,192 || 24–32–11 || 59 || 
|- style="background:#cfc;"
| 68 || March 17 || Buffalo || 5–2 ||  || Hart || Wells Fargo Center || 18,051 || 25–32–11 || 61 || 
|- style="background:#;"
| 69 || March 18 || Carolina || – ||  ||  || Wells Fargo Center ||  ||  ||  || 
|- style="background:#;"
| 70 || March 21 || Florida || – ||  ||  || Wells Fargo Center ||  ||  ||  || 
|- style="background:#;"
| 71 || March 23 || Minnesota || – ||  ||  || Wells Fargo Center ||  ||  ||  || 
|- style="background:#;"
| 72 || March 25 || Detroit || – ||  ||  || Wells Fargo Center ||  ||  ||  || 
|- style="background:#;"
| 73 || March 28 || Montreal || – ||  ||  || Wells Fargo Center ||  ||  ||  || 
|- style="background:#;"
| 74 || March 30 || @ Ottawa || – ||  ||  || Canadian Tire Centre ||  ||  ||  || 
|-

|- style="background:#;"
| 75 || April 1 || Buffalo || – ||  ||  || Wells Fargo Center ||  ||  ||  || 
|- style="background:#;"
| 76 || April 2 || @ Pittsburgh || – ||  ||  || PPG Paints Arena ||  ||  ||  || 
|- style="background:#;"
| 77 || April 4 || @ St. Louis || – ||  ||  || Enterprise Center ||  ||  ||  || 
|- style="background:#;"
| 78 || April 6 || @ Dallas || – ||  ||  || American Airlines Center ||  ||  ||  || 
|- style="background:#;"
| 79 || April 8 || @ NY Islanders || – ||  ||  || UBS Arena ||  ||  ||  || 
|- style="background:#;"
| 80 || April 9 || Boston || – ||  ||  || Wells Fargo Center ||  ||  ||  || 
|- style="background:#;"
| 81 || April 11 || Columbus || – ||  ||  || Wells Fargo Center ||  ||  ||  || 
|- style="background:#;"
| 82 || April 13 || @ Chicago || – ||  ||  || United Center ||  ||  ||  || 
|-

|- style="text-align:center;"
| Legend:       = Win       = Loss       = OT/SO Loss

Roster

Transactions
The Flyers have been involved in the following transactions during the 2022–23 season.

Key:

 Contract is entry-level.
 Contract initially takes effect in the 2023–24 season.

Trades

Notes:
 Carolina will receive the lower of Florida's, Philadelphia's, or the New York Rangers' 3rd-round pick in 2023.

Players acquired

Players lost

Signings

Draft picks

Below are the Philadelphia Flyers' selections at the 2022 NHL Entry Draft, which was held on July 7 to 8, 2022, at Bell Centre in Montreal.

References

Philadelphia Flyers seasons
Flyers
2022 in sports in Pennsylvania
2023 in sports in Pennsylvania